Eileen Chengyin Chow   (chinese: 周成蔭) is a sinologist, Chinese translator and University Teacher. She works for the Duke University and for the Shih Hsin University in Taipei, Taiwan.

Life 
She graduated in Literature from Harvard University and studied her Ph.D in Comparative Literature at Stanford University. Together with Carlos Rojas , in 2009 she translated to English Brothers, the longest novel written by the Chinese novelist Yu Hua. The novel was shortlisted for the Man Asian Literary Prize and was awarded France's Prix Courrier International in 2008.

She is director of the Cheng Shewo Institute of Chinese Journalism at the Shih Hsin University.

She is the granddaughter of Cheng Shewo, a journalist, publisher, and educator of the Republic of China, who founded the Shih Hsin University in Taiwan.

Selected publications 
 Rojas, C., and E. C. Y. Chow. Rethinking chinese popular culture: Cannibalizations of the canon, 2008. 
 Yu, H. Brothers: A Novel by Yu Hua. Translated by Carlos Rojas and E. Cheng-yin Chow. Pantheon, 2009. 
 Rojas, C., and Eileen Cheng-yin Chow, eds. The Oxford Handbook of Chinese Cinemas. New York: Oxford University Press, 2013. 
 Rojas, C., and E. Chow, eds. Oxford Handbook of Chinese Cinemas. Oxford University Press, 2013
 Lung Yingtai, translated by Eileen Cheng-yin Chow: 1949: China, Trauma and Memory, Los Angeles Review of Books, 2020.

References 

Living people
Sinologists
Chinese translators
Duke University faculty
Academic staff of Shih Hsin University
Harvard University alumni
Stanford University alumni
Taiwanese women academics
21st-century Taiwanese writers
Year of birth missing (living people)